Jatudih is a village in Dhanbad CD Block in Dhanbad subdivision of Dhanbad district, in the state of Jharkhand, India.

Demographics
As per the 2011 Census of India, Jatudih had a total population of 450 of which 222 (49%) were males and 228 (51%) were females. Population below 6 years was 82. The total number of literates in Jatudih was 263 (71.47% of the population over 6 years).

References

Villages in Dhanbad district